Maxon Spafford Lough (September 15, 1886 – July 13, 1964) was an American brigadier general and commanded the Philippine Division during the Battle of Bataan in World War II.

Lough served in the Philippine Constabulary from January 1908 to August 1911. He was commissioned as a second lieutenant of the U.S. Army Infantry in December 1911.

During World War I, Lough served as a major with the 38th Infantry Regiment, 3rd Division in France. He was awarded the Distinguished Service Cross and two Purple Hearts.

After the war, Lough graduated from the Infantry School advanced course in 1923, the Command and General Staff School in 1924 and the Army War College in 1928. He was promoted to lieutenant colonel in August 1935 and colonel in September 1940.

Sent to the Philippines, Lough received a temporary promotion to brigadier general in October 1941. After being held as a prisoner of war for over three years, he retired from active duty as a brigadier general on August 31, 1946.

Lough was buried at Arlington National Cemetery on July 17, 1964.

References

External links
Generals of World War II

1886 births
1964 deaths
People from Fargo, North Dakota
Military personnel from North Dakota
United States Army personnel of World War I
Recipients of the Distinguished Service Cross (United States)
United States Army Command and General Staff College alumni
United States Army War College alumni
United States Army generals of World War II
Recipients of the Distinguished Service Medal (US Army)
American prisoners of war in World War II
World War II prisoners of war held by Japan
Bataan Death March prisoners
United States Army generals
Burials at Arlington National Cemetery